Foreign exchange fraud is any trading scheme used to defraud traders by convincing them that they can expect to gain a high profit by trading in the foreign exchange market. Currency trading became a common form of fraud in early 2008, according to Michael Dunn of the U.S. Commodity Futures Trading Commission.

The foreign exchange market is at best a zero-sum game,
meaning that whatever one trader gains, another loses. However, brokerage commissions and other transaction costs are subtracted from the results of all traders, making foreign exchange a negative-sum game.

US Government interventions
In August 2008, the CFTC set up a special task force to deal with growing foreign exchange fraud. In January 2010, the CFTC proposed new rules limiting leverage to 10 to 1, based on "a number of improper practices" in the retail foreign exchange market, "among them solicitation fraud, a lack of transparency in the pricing and execution of transactions, unresponsiveness to customer complaints, and the targeting of unsophisticated, elderly, low net worth and other vulnerable individuals".

In 2012, Christopher Ehrman, an SEC veteran, was selected to run the new SEC Office of the Whistleblower.

Types of fraud
Frauds might include churning of customer accounts for the purpose of generating commissions, selling software that is supposed to guide the customer to large profits,
improperly managed "managed accounts",
false advertising,
Ponzi schemes, and outright fraud.
It also refers to any retail forex broker who indicates that trading foreign exchange is a low risk, high profit investment.

Increase in fraud
The U.S. Commodity Futures Trading Commission (CFTC), which regulates the foreign exchange market in the United States, has noted an increase in the amount of unscrupulous activity in the non-bank foreign exchange industry. Between 2001 and 2006, the CFTC has prosecuted more than 80 cases involving the defrauding of more than 23,000 customers who lost . From 2001 to 2007, about 26,000 people lost  in forex frauds.

Not beating the market
The foreign exchange market is a zero-sum game in which there are many experienced, well-capitalized professional traders (e.g. working for banks) who can devote their attention full-time to trading. An inexperienced retail trader will have a significant information disadvantage compared to these traders.

Retail traders are undercapitalized. Thus, they are subject to the problem of gambler's ruin: in a "fair game" (one with no information advantages) the player with the lower amount of capital has a higher probability of going bankrupt than a high-capital player. The retail trader always pays the bid/ask spread which makes their odds of winning less than those of a fair game. Additional costs may include margin interest or, if a spot position is kept open for more than one day, the trade may be "resettled" each day, each time costing the full bid/ask spread. In some variations of forex trading, the customers do not obtain normal fungible futures, but instead make a contract with some named company. Even if the company claims to act as their "forex dealer", it is financially interested in making the retail customer lose money. The contract is directly between the customer and the pseudo-dealer, so it is an off-exchange one; it cannot be normally registered and traded on futures exchanges.

Although it is possible for a few experts to successfully arbitrage the market for an unusually large return, this does not mean that a larger number could earn the same returns even given the same tools, techniques, and data sources. This is because the arbitrages are essentially drawn from a pool of finite size; although information about how to capture arbitrages is a nonrival good, the arbitrages themselves are a rival good. In analogy: the total amount of buried treasure on an island is the same, regardless of how many treasure hunters have bought copies of the treasure map.

High leverage
By offering high leverage, some market makers encourage traders to trade extremely large positions. This increases the trading volume cleared by the market maker and increases their profit, but increases the risk that the trader will receive a margin call. While professional currency dealers such as banks and hedge funds tend to use no more than 10:1 leverage, retail clients may be offered leverage up to 1000:1.

Fraud by country
To aid with transparency, some regulatory authorities openly publish the following: list of regulated companies/firms, warnings to regulated companies, cases opened against regulated companies, fines levied to regulated companies, revocation of companies license as well as general news announcements.

United Kingdom
The Financial Conduct Authority (FCA) website lists guides to aid with avoiding fraud/scams as well as public list of warnings recorded by the FCA.
 Official FCA Investment Firm Warning List
 Online guide on how to avoid scams
 FCA Guide on how to report a scam
 FCA Investment Scam support website
 FCA News on Investment Firms

Cyprus
The Cyprus Securities and Exchange Commission (CySEC) provides public access to information regarding the process for how to obtain a CIF authorisation as well as listed the current and past CySEC authorised companies.
 List of current 'Cyprus Investment Firms' (CIFs)
 List of former Cyprus Investment Firms
 List of issued CySEC Warnings
 List of announced Board Decisions (including fines)

Convicted scammers
 Russell Cline
 Russell Erxleben
 Sterling Currency Group
 Joel N. Ward
 WinCapita

See also
 Boiler room
 Bucket shop
 Foreign exchange market
 Forex scandal
 Fraud
 Gambler's conceit
 Gambler's ruin
 High-yield investment program

References

External links
 US Commodity Futures Trading Commission Forex Fraud Advisory

Foreign exchange market
Finance fraud
Confidence tricks
Cyberbullying
Fraud